is a district in Kyoto spanning from Kamigyō ward to Kita ward. Though it is well-known as a district, there is no administractive area called "Nishijin".

History 
In Kyoto, the textile production industry has existed since the 5th century, and it is said that weaving craftsmen gathered in Kuromon Kamichōja-machi (located around the southernmost portion of the modern Nishijin district) in the Heian period. 

The name Nishijin derives from Yamana Sōzen, a  who fought in the Ōnin War (1467–1477); literally meaning "Western camp", others set up a camp in what would become Nishijin, located west from Horikawa.

After the Ōnin War, weaving craftsmen who had been scattered throughout the country returned to Kyoto and resumed their activities. At that time, the area became known as Nishijin.

There is a historic site of Nishijin between Imadegawa-Ōmiya and Imadegawa-Horikawa. The Imamiya festival of the Imamiya Shrine is known as the festival of Nishijin.

In 2008, Nishijin woven products totalled roughly ¥81.8 billion, with 465 vendors. Weaving machines used in  production totalled 4,783 (3,600 power loom, 1,200 hand looms). Around 30,000 people were directly or indirectly engaged in the Nishijin weaving industry.

Geographic location 

Notes

References

Bibliography 
  (Takahashi, 1983)
  (Honda, 2009)
  (Honda, 2012)

External links
 (ja) Nishijin Gakku
 (ja) Nishijin website
 Nishijin Homepage (English)
 http://www.city.kyoto.jp/koho/eng/index.html

Geography of Kyoto